The New Zealand cricket team toured South Africa from 18 December 2012 to 25 January 2013. The tour consisted of two test matches, three One Day Internationals, and three Twenty20 International matches. In their first innings of the First Test, New Zealand were dismissed for just 45 runs, their third lowest Test match total and the lowest total in Test cricket in 39 years. In the same match, South African cricketer Jacques Kallis became the fourth batsman to make 13,000 runs in Test cricket. New Zealand were without ex-captain Ross Taylor, who had a falling out with coach Mike Hesson, and Jesse Ryder, who remained in self-imposed exile from international cricket.

Squads

Tour Match

T20: South Africa XI v New Zealanders

First class: South Africa XI v New Zealanders

T20I series

1st T20I

2nd T20I

3rd T20I

Test Series

1st Test

2nd Test

ODI Series

1st ODI

2nd ODI

3rd ODI

References

External links
 New Zealand tour of South Africa 2012/13 at ESPNcricinfo.com

2012 in South African cricket
2012 in New Zealand cricket
2013 in South African cricket
2013 in New Zealand cricket
2012-13
2012–13 South African cricket season
International cricket competitions in 2012–13